LFD may refer to:
Large format display, a flat-screen television used for advertising signage
 Lateral flow device (or test), in medicine
 Lingfield railway station, Surrey, England
 , a French school in India
 , a French school in Djibouti